The 2004 Vaahteraliiga season was the 25th season of the highest level of American football in Finland. The regular season took place between June 5 and August 23, 2004. The Finnish champion was determined in the playoffs and at the championship game Vaahteramalja XXV the Helsinki Roosters won the Turku Trojans.

Standings

Playoffs

References 

American football in Finland
Vaahteraliiga
Vaahteraliiga